Saathi: The Companion is a 2005 film. The film was a box office failure.

Cast 
 Rupa Dutta as Varsha
 Divvij Kak as Vijay
 Anchal Anand as Anjali
 Sameer Ali Khan as Akash
 Alok Nath
 Beena Banerjee
 Tiku Talsania
 Gajendra Chauhan
 Razak Khan
 Narendra Bedi

Music
Tumse Dil Kya Laga Liya Humne (2) - Sanjeev, Shreya Ghoshal, Roop Kumar Rathod
Tumko Ham Iss Kadar Pyaar Karne Lage - Kumar Sanu, Shreya Ghoshal
Kehata Hai Dil Sun Ae Sanam - Shaan
Kitna Akela Tha Dil - Priya Bhattacharya, Udit Narayan
Tumse Dil Kya Laga Liya Hamne - Roop Kumar Rathod
Yeh Chehara, Yeh Rangat - Kumar Sanu

References

External links 
 
 

2005 films
2000s Hindi-language films
Films scored by Nikhil-Vinay